The Okaloosa County Women's Hall of Fame (OCWHOF) is a tribute to women who live or have lived in Okaloosa County, Florida. The Hall of Fame is meant to "recognize and honor women who have helped to improve the community," says Jeanette Debs, a chairwoman of the OCWHOF. The Hall of Fame is largely virtual, with the first physical display set up in 2006 at the Crestview courthouse. Photographs of past inductees are displayed in Crestview and in Niceville. Nominations are accepted from the public in several areas of endeavor.

The OCWHOF was founded in 1995 by the Okaloosa County Commission on the Status of Women (OCCSW). Gayle Melich, a women's rights activist, is considered one of the "Founding Mothers" of the Hall of Fame. Bobelle Sconiers Harrell is one well-known inductee of the OCWHOF.

References

External links 
 Official site

1995 establishments in Florida
Okaloosa County, Florida
Halls of fame in Florida
Women's halls of fame
History of women in Florida
Awards established in 1995